İcikli may refer to:

 İcikli, Baklan
 İcikli, Şuhut